Tribunal is a station on Line 1 and Line 10 of the Madrid Metro. Originally opened under the name Hospicio, it has been operating since 1919. It is located in Zone A.

History
The station opened on 17 October 1919 and was one of the first 8 stations on the network. Its original name came from the Real Hospicio de San Fernando, located on Calle Fuencarral near the metro's entrance. It was later renamed Tribunal, after the Tribunal de Cuentas, also located on Calle Fuencarral near the metro's entrance.

The Line 10 platforms opened on 18 December 1981 as part of the Carabanchel–Chamartín de la Rosa suburbano railway then operated by FEVE, which shortly afterwards was transferred to the Community of Madrid.

References 

Line 1 (Madrid Metro) stations
Line 10 (Madrid Metro) stations
Railway stations in Spain opened in 1919